Logres (among various other forms and spellings) is King Arthur's realm in the Matter of Britain. It derives from the medieval Welsh word Lloegyr, a name of uncertain origin referring to South and Eastern England (Lloegr in modern Welsh for all of England).

In Arthurian contexts, "Logres" is often used to describe the Brittonic territory roughly corresponding to the borders of England before the area was taken by the Anglo-Saxons. According to Geoffrey of Monmouth's influential pseudohistory Historia Regum Britanniae, the realm was named after the legendary king Locrinus, the oldest son of Brutus of Troy. In his Historia, Geoffrey uses the word "Loegria" to describe a province containing most of England excluding Cornwall and possibly Northumberland, as in this example from section iv.20 (from the Penguin Classics translation by Lewis Thorpe):

It was described by Chrétien de Troyes as "The Land of Ogres" (l'Ogres) in his poem Perceval, the Story of the Grail. In various French works, Logres appears as the name of the land or the capital city (otherwise Camelot), its inhabitants can be known as either Loegrwys or Lloegrwys. Translating and compiling such texts for his Le Morte d'Arthur, Thomas Malory conflated Logres with his contemporary Kingdom of England and usually used just "England" instead, except for the names of some of the Knights of the Round Table. In some medieval German works, Logres is the personal domain of Gawain, as established by Wolfram von Eschenbach.

The name "Logres" is also used in several works of modern fantasy set in Britain, for example, C. S. Lewis's That Hideous Strength and Susan Cooper's Over Sea, Under Stone.

See also
 Albion
 Prydain

References

External links
Logres at Encyclopædia Arthuriana

Locations associated with Arthurian legend
Geoffrey of Monmouth
Terminology of the British Isles